Rome Wasn't Burned in a Day is the nineteenth solo album by Julian Cope, released in 2003.

Released to coincide with a three-night festival of the same name, organised by Cope, on 30 October, 31 October and 1 November 2003 in London.
The album was only made available via Cope's own Head Heritage website.

Track listing 
All tracks written by Julian Cope
 "Shrine of the Black Youth" – 8:19
"Zennor Quoit" – 2:43
 "The-Way-Luv-Is" – 10:12
 "King Minos" – 4:22
 "Dance by the Light of the Bridges You Burn" – 3:32
 "Michelle of My Former Self / Far Out" – 4:31
 "Eccentrifugal Force" – 20:40

Note

"Far Out" is listed as a separate track on the album cover.

Personnel 
Credits adapted from the album's liner notes.
Julian Cope – vocals
Donald Ross Skinner – guitar, bass
Anthony "Doggen" Foster – guitar, bass
Christopher Patrick "Holy" McGrail – synthesizer
Gavin Skinner – drums
Recorded by Adam Whittaker, Terry Dobbin, L.S. Deeds, Hugoth Nicolson

References

External links
 Rome Wasn't Burned in a Day on Discogs.com. Retrieved on 4 March 2018.

2003 albums
Julian Cope albums